Populaire is a 2012 French romantic comedy-drama film directed by Régis Roinsard. It was co-written by Roinsard, Daniel Presley and Romain Compingt. Populaire was released in France on 28 November 2012. The film's title is taken from the name of the typewriter (Japy Populaire) used in the film. Populaire tells the story of Rose Pamphyle (Déborah François), who is trained by Louis Échard (Romain Duris) to become the fastest typist in the world through winning the 1959 international speed typing contest in New York City.

Plot
Set in 1958–1959, Populaire focuses on Rose Pamphyle (Déborah François), who lives with her widowed father and is destined to marry a son of the local mechanic. Rose travels out of town and applies for a secretarial job with an insurance agency run by Louis Échard (Romain Duris). Louis learns that Rose can type with extraordinary speed—using only two fingers—and he tells her to compete in a speed-typing competition if she wants the job.

While Rose makes the finals, she ultimately loses her first typing competition. Louis begins training Rose to become the fastest typist in the world.  He makes a bet with his best friend, Bob Taylor—who is married to his old sweetheart, Marie—that Rose can win the regional competition.

Louis begins to train Rose at his home, but he sets strict rules to prevent others from knowing that Rose is staying in his boyhood bedroom. He begins to teach her to type with all 10 fingers and Louis insists she take piano lessons (taught by Marie) to strengthen her fingers. As she struggles to learn to type with 10 fingers, Louis encourages her, colour-coding the keys on her typewriter and teaching her better posture. As the seasons change, she excels and Louis and Rose become close friends.

Rose wins her second typing competition, becoming the fastest in her home region of Lower Normandy. It becomes obvious to Louis' friends that Louis and Rose are romantically interested in each other, but Louis insists that a coach mustn't distract his student. They travel to Paris together and the night before the French national competition, Louis and Rose announce their love to one another and have sex.

Competing against the current national champion, Rose makes it to the finals, but struggles under the pressure. Before her final match, Louis tells Rose that he had been lying and that he has secretly been recording that her typing speed is regularly faster than her opponent's best record. Angered by his lie, Rose is enraged into winning. Rose is ecstatic at winning and flashes Louis a big smile from on stage. After initially being elated, Louis begins to feel inadequate for somewhat ambiguous reasons. He abandons her and their training sessions.

Rose stays in Paris and becomes a French celebrity, endorsed by a major typing firm and begins using their newest typewriter. She never forgets Louis and calls him regularly, although Louis never answers the phone. Louis tries to move on, but is generally depressed and feels inadequate. Rose begins to move on and is soon in New York at the world typing competition.

While Rose starts the world competition in New York, Louis struggles with his own feelings. He reaches out to Marie and asks why she chose Bob over him. She says she didn't: Louis chose to be second place. Louis explains that he could never give Rose the smile and happiness she had when she won in Paris—the same smile that he saw on Marie on her wedding day to Bob. Marie says, "I was smiling because I felt loved."

Louis realises he needs to overcome his own feelings of inadequacy and flies to New York to support Rose in the international typing competition. He arrives just before the second round of the finals ends. As the judges announce the results, Rose is behind and struggling. She runs backstage to fetch her old typewriter, and Louis confronts her and professes his love. They kiss.

Rose goes on stage for the last round - seemingly energised by love. She races ahead in the final match. About halfway in, her typewriter jams. She is too fast for the typewriter. She quickly recovers and races ahead again, winning the competition to be the World's Fastest Typist. Louis walks on stage and kisses her, the film ending with the two holding hands and the audience cheering.

Cast

 Déborah François as Rose Pamphyle
 Romain Duris as Louis Échard
 Bérénice Bejo as Marie Taylor
 Shaun Benson as Bob Taylor
 Mélanie Bernier as Annie Leprince-Ringuet
 Féodor Atkine as André Japy
 Nicolas Bedos as Gilbert Japy
 Eddy Mitchell as Georges Échard
 Miou-Miou as Madeleine Échard
 Sara Haskell as Susan Hunter
 Frédéric Pierrot as Jean Pamphyle
 Jeanne Cohendy as Françoise
 Dominique Reymond as Madamme Shorofsky
 Caroline Tillette as La Vamp
 Serpentine Teyssier as Mrs. Teyssier
 Marius Colucci as Lucien Échard
 Emeline Bayart as Jacqueline Échard
 Yannik Landrein as Léonard Échard
 Nastassja Girard as Evelyne Échard
 Pauline Morro as Simone Taylor
 Hugo de Sousa as Joe Taylor
 Fanny Sidney as The fan
 Joan Mompart as Cha-cha-chá singer

Production

Casting

Roinsard was planning to cast an unknown actress in the lead role of Rose Pamphyle, but chose Belgian actress Déborah François after she impressed him in her audition. After asking her father to find a typewriter for her, François practised for a week before the audition. She told Georgia Dehn from The Daily Telegraph, "I was so fast at the audition that everyone watching asked whether I had done it much before. Of course I didn't admit to practising. I told them, 'I'm just really motivated, I really want the part, I'm ready for competition.'"
François believed that she connected with Rose as soon as she finished reading the script. She loved Rose's clumsiness and thought she was a bit like herself. François underwent six months of professional typing coaching before filming commenced. She had to practice for up to three hours every day. The actress explained that as they wanted it to be real, nothing is speeded up in the film and her hands are featured in every scene.

Romain Duris was cast as Louis Échard. Duris was initially concerned about whether the costumes and style would take over, causing the film to be stuck in the past. He said he needed the film to feel live and real. The actor watched several films starring Cary Grant and James Stewart as well as French classics directed by Marcel Carné and Claude Chabrol to see the differences between the provinces and Paris and the ways in which people behaved and spoke in the 1950s.

Costume design
Costume designer Charlotte David created and designed many of the clothes for the film. David previously created costumes for OSS 117: Cairo, Nest of Spies, which was also set in France in the fifties. Laure Guilbault from Women's Wear Daily reported that the look of Populaire was inspired by Funny Face, The Seven Year Itch and Alfred Hitchcock films. François revealed that she gave her own input for the costumes, saying "I loved being involved in the creation of costumes. I could say that these suspenders should be thinner, or this skirt should be worn with an extra petticoat, or have a bow added." David thought the right lingerie was crucial to the look and pointy bras, girdles and bodices were used to underpin the silhouettes. Some of the lingerie was made by Parisian corsetry house Cadolle.

As Rose is "a young provincial woman", she often wears pretty dresses, while Bejo's character Marie, who is married to an American man, has a casual early Sixties look. David explained that she wanted Marie to be a modern woman and she found printed fabrics for her costumes at De Gilles, a fabric shop in Paris, which she used to make short pants. She then completed the look with silk knit jerseys, ballet shoes, headbands and tight cardigans. Lelia Delval, the hairstylist for Populaire, gave Bejo a red wig to wear, which the actress liked so much, she dyed her real hair red for her next film. The men wore tailor-made suits and tie clips. Duris' character Louis sports a vintage Jaeger-LeCoultre watch.

Music
The musical score of the film was written by French artists Rob and Emmanuel d'Orlando. The soundtrack also uses pre-existing music tracks. It was released on 28 November 2012. Roinsard decided to use music from three years before and after the year in which the film takes place. When choosing the pre-existing music, Roinsard combined his love of American lounge music, light jazz and '50s composers with French songs by lesser-known artists such as Jack Ary, Jacqueline Boyer and Les Chaussettes Noires, whose singer Eddy Mitchell appears in the film. Roinsard thought Rob and Emmanuel d'Orlando's score added "great emotional impact to the film." The director was inspired by both '50s and '60s recording methods for the score, which was recorded in France. Roinsard added "The end result is close to a musical and I'm delighted since Stanley Donen and Bob Fosse are favourites of mine."

Release
Populaire had its world premiere at the Sarlat Film Festival. It was then released in France on 28 November 2012. Populaire played at the Glasgow Film Festival in February, before it was released in the UK on 31 May 2013. The film was released on 6 September 2013 in the United States.

Reception

Critical response
Populaire earned €406,295 upon its opening weekend in France. The film opened to 450 theatres and landed at number three in the French box office top 10. As of 28 May 2013, Populaire has grossed $5,315,819 worldwide.

The review aggregator website Rotten Tomatoes reported a 74% approval rating with an average rating of 6.7/10 based on 61 reviews. The website's consensus reads, "The cheerfully frothy Populaire may lack substance, but its visual appeal – and director Roinsard's confident evocation of 1950s filmmaking tropes – help carry the day." Metacritic, which assigns a score of 1–100 to individual film reviews, gave Populaire an average rating of 57 based on 25 reviews, indicating "mixed or average reviews".

Jérôme Vermelin from Metro France commented "Full of charm, this first film by young director Régis Roinsard is carried by an irresistible duo of Romain Duris and Deborah François." Liz Beardsworth from Empire gave Populaire three stars and wrote "Roinsard keeps control of a film that vacillates between frothy fun and more serious social comment and cleverly uses subplots and supporting characters (including The Artist's Bérénice Bejo) to touch on weightier themes. Quaint, but charming."

IndieWire's Kaleem Aftab awarded the film a B− and stated "With a great cast and sufficient laughs, Populaire could find international audiences, but it's no Amelie. The orthodox script will not broaden appeal outside the dedicated romcom market and the language barrier may also be a problem for some." Boyd van Hoeij, writing for Variety, said the film is "a colorful and impeccably styled romantic comedy that manages to turn the speed-typing competitions of the 1950s into entertaining cinematic fodder." He went on to praise the performances of Duris and François, but thought the story did not quite take any unexpected turns or reveal any deeper emotions.

Accolades

References

External links

2012 romantic comedy films
2012 films
Films set in 1958
Typing
Language competitions
Belgian romantic comedy films
Belgian sports comedy films
French sports comedy films
French romantic comedy films
2010s sports comedy films
2010s French-language films
French-language Belgian films
French films set in New York City
2010s French films